Wonder Woman: The Blue Amazon is a DC Comics comic book and a Wonder Woman Elseworlds publication. It is the third - and final - part of a trilogy based on German Expressionist cinema, preceded by Superman's Metropolis and Batman: Nosferatu. It was written by Jean-Marc Lofficier and Randy Lofficier and illustrated by Ted McKeever.

The story of Wonder Woman: The Blue Amazon is "patterned" after the classic films Metropolis, The Blue Angel and Dr. Mabuse the Gambler.

Characters
DC characters which appear in the story (in order of appearance):

Lois Lane
Steve Trevor-son
Diana/the Wonder-Woman
Dr. Psykho
the Cheetah
Lutor (flashback)
Bruss Wayne-son/the Nosferatu
Jon Kent (flashback)
Paula von Gunther (flashback)
Clarc Kent-son/the Super-Man
Arkham Asylum
Bane
Two-Face
the Penguin
Poison Ivy
Killer Croc
the Ventriloquist and Scarface

Plot
Metropolis is at peace. Lois Lane researches the history of the city with the help of Steve Trevor-son. They discover information about the three founders of Metropolis, Jon Kent, Lutor and Paula von Gunther, who crossed the "black sea" after the "time of smoke and soot" to create the city. Trevor-son, meanwhile, is in thrall to the exotic dancer Diana, also known as "the Blue Amazon", who appears at Dr. Psykho's Palace of Sin, the last remnant of Lutor's criminal empire. Psykho exploits the amnesiac Diana, who was given to him by Lutor, but cannot divine her origins. When Trevor-son tries to free her, he is taken prisoner.

Meanwhile, a creature called the Cheetah has come to Metropolis looking for Diana. After a brief encounter with the Nosferatu, the Cheetah locates Diana. Psykho uses his mental powers to learn the truth. Metropolis is on a terraformed Mars, where the survivors of mankind, led by Jon Kent, Lutor and Paula von Gunther, resettled after Earth was destroyed by pollution. Biologist Paula von Gunther later left the others and created her own artificial, flying city, known as "Heaven", where she used her knowledge of genetics and the genes of the Earth animals she saved, to create her own race of beast-like Amazons. Diana is her perfect clone.

Later, needing new genetic stock, Paula sent Diana to Metropolis below, where she was captured and had her memories erased by Lutor. In Heaven, the Cheetah led a rebellion and killed Paula. But now, she, too, needs Diana in order to save the Amazons. Psykho makes a deal with the Cheetah: he will give her Diana if she kills the Super-Man for him.

The Cheetah leads her Amazons in a battle royale against the Super-Man, who is then assisted by the Nosferatu and the inmates from the asylum. When Psykho tries to kill Trevor-son, Diana's love for him is enough to restore her memories. She becomes the "Wonder-Woman", challenges the Cheetah to a duel and wins, killing her foe. Psykho is locked up in the asylum with the other inmates. Peace is restored to Metropolis; the three "worlds", the city and the two worlds above it and below it, are reunited; the truth about the past has at last been revealed.

Publication

Wonder Woman: The Blue Amazon (64 pages, 2003, ISBN B000GINV2U)

Trilogy
This is the third part of a trilogy:

Superman's Metropolis
Batman: Nosferatu
Wonder Woman: The Blue Amazon

Writer Jean-Marc Lofficier had a fourth and final book planned, entitled The Green Light, which would have introduced counterparts of Green Lantern, the Flash and the Martian Manhunter (based on Leni Riefenstahl's Das Blaue Licht (U.S. title: The Blue Light (1932)) and Arnold Fanck's Der Weiße Rausch - Der Neue Wunder des Schneeschuhs (U.S. title: The White Ecstasy (1931)) (which also starred Leni Riefenstahl)), and a female version of Aquaman (based on Georg Wilhelm Pabst's Die Herrin von Atlantis (U.S. title: The Mistress of Atlantis (1932))). The book would have dealt with the rediscovery of Earth, but was never published and remains so to this day.

See also
 List of Elseworlds publications

References

External links
The Lofficiers' page on Wonder Woman: The Blue Amazon

Elseworlds titles
Wonder Woman titles
DC Comics limited series